Lophiotoma tayabasensis is a species of sea snail, a marine gastropod mollusk in the family Turridae, the turrids.

Description
The length of the shell varies between 70 m mand 110 mm.

Distribution
This marine species occurs off the Philippines and Southern India.

References

 Bouchet, P.; Fontaine, B. (2009). List of new marine species described between 2002-2006. Census of Marine Life

External links
 Gastropods.com: Gemmula (Unedogemmula) tayabasensis

tayabasensis
Gastropods described in 2004